The Missouri S&T Miners football program represents Missouri University of Science and Technology in college football and competes in the Division II level of the National Collegiate Athletics Association (NCAA). In 2012, Missouri S&T became a member of the Great Lakes Valley Conference and has remained in the league since. Prior to this, Missouri S&T was in the Great Lakes Football Conference, and the Mid-America Intercollegiate Athletics Association from 1935 to 2005. S&T's home games are played at Allgood–Bailey Stadium in Rolla, Missouri. The program maintains an all-time record of 425–557–35.

Conference affiliations
 1935–2005: Missouri Intercollegiate Athletic Association / Mid-America Intercollegiate Athletics Association
 2007–2011: Great Lakes Football Conference
 2012–present: Great Lakes Valley Conference

Stadium

The Miners have played their home games at Allgood–Bailey Stadium since 1967. The current capacity of the stadium is at 8,000.

Championships

Conference championship seasons

Postseason appearances

Notable players

Current NFL Players

Former NFL Players

References

External links
 

 
American football teams established in 1893
1893 establishments in Missouri